Zlatko Burić (born 13 May 1953) is a Croatian actor.

Biography
He was born in Osijek where he was educated at the Dramski Studio in 1972. In the 1970s and early 1980s, Burić belonged to the experimental theater group Kugla Glumište (formed in 1975) together with Željko Zorica-Šiš and Damir Bartol-Indoš.

He moved to Denmark in 1981 where he married Sonja Hindkjær, with whom he has three children. After their divorce, he married Dragana Milutinović, on 7 October 1998. He has appeared in several successful Danish films from the 1990s and 2000s, frequently appearing in films directed by Nicolas Winding Refn, including Bleeder and as Milo in The Pusher Trilogy. For his role in Pusher, he won the Bodil Award for best supporting actor in 1997.

In 2009, Burić had a large supporting role in the apocalyptic film 2012, as Yuri Karpov, a Russian billionaire. In 2012, he reprised his role as Milo in the British remake of Pusher.

Filmography

Film

Television

References

Sources

External links 
 

1953 births
20th-century Danish male actors
21st-century Danish male actors
Best Supporting Actor Bodil Award winners
Danish male film actors
Danish male television actors
Danish people of Croatian descent
Living people
People from Osijek
Yugoslav emigrants to Denmark